Onkar Singh (born 8 October 1968) is an Indian Professor of Mechanical Engineering and Vice Chancellor of Veer Madho Singh Bhandari Uttarakhand Technical University, Dehradun. He has been the founder Vice-Chancellor of Madan Mohan Malaviya University of Technology,  former Vice-Chancellor of Veer Chandra Singh Garhwali Uttarakhand University of Horticulture and Forestry, Pauri Garhwal / Tehri Garhwal , and former Vice-Chancellor of Uttar Pradesh Technical University.

Early life and education
Singh was born  in Kanpur, Uttar Pradesh. His father is a retired Indian Air Force personnel.

Singh did his B.Tech. from Kanpur University's Harcourt Butler Technological Institute (now Harcourt Butler Technical University) in 1989. After that, he joined University of Allahabad's Motilal Nehru Regional Engineering College (now Motilal Nehru National Institute of Technology, Allahabad) and completed his M.E. and Ph.D. in 1991 and 2000 respectively.

Career
After completing his master's he joined Institute of Engineering and Technology, Lucknow as a faculty. In 1999 he joined Harcourt Butler Technological Institute (now Harcourt Butler Technical University) as a faculty and later became Head, Department of Mechanical Engineering, Harcourt Butler Technological Institute.  He also worked as additional controller of examination and later as vice-chancellor at Uttar Pradesh Technical University. After establishment of Madan Mohan Malaviya University of Technology (MMMUT) he joined as its founding vice-chancellor in 2013. He spearheaded the transformation of Madan Mohan Malaviya Engineering College into one of India's top emerging universities – MMMUT.

He has been associated with many apex bodies and organisations of India. He is a member of Board of Governors of many institutions, some of which include (past as well as current associations) -

 Member, Board of Governors, Indian Institute of Technology, Kanpur (U.P.)
 Member, Board of Governors, Indian Institute of Technology, BHU, Varanasi (U.P.)
 Member, Northern Regional Committee, All India Council for Technical Education, New Delhi
 Member, General Council, National Board of Accreditation, New Delhi
 Member, Finance Committee, National Board of Accreditation, New Delhi
 Member, Board of Governors, Gautam Buddha University, Greater Noida(U.P.)
 Member, General Council, Ram Manohar Law University, Lucknow (U.P.)
 Member, Court, University of Allahabad, Allahabad (U.P.)
 Member, Board of Governors, Kamla Nehru Institute of Technology, Sultanpur (U.P.)
 Member, Board of Governors, U.P. Textile Technology Institute, Kanpur (U.P.)
 Member, Governing Council, Jaypee University of Information Technology, Waknaghat, Solan (H.P.)
 Member, Executive Council, Allahabad State University, Allahabad (U.P.)
 Member, Executive Council, Jannayak Chandrashekhar University, Ballia (U.P.)
 Member, Board of Governors, Institute of Engineering & Technology, Dr. Ram Manohar Lohia Avadh University, Faizabad (U.P.)
 President, Alumni Association, HBTI, Kanpur
 Member, Board of Governors, Lucknow College of Architecture, Lucknow

Awards and recognitions 
Onkar has been a Limca Book of Records holder twice (2014, 2015) for his novel work in air turbine-engine based motorbike. He is also a holder of three patents –

 "Motorised Wheel Chair" Jointly with Artificial Limbs Manufacturing Corporation Ltd., Kanpur
 "Solar Powered Tricycle" Jointly with Artificial Limbs Manufacturing Corporation Ltd., Kanpur
 "Rotary & Vane Type Air Engine" -  jointly with Bharat Raj Singh

He has also received several awards at national and international levels, which include –

 Honorary Fellowship - 2020 of Indian Society for Technical Education New Delhi received on 5 October 2021
 AICTE Young Teacher Career Award, 2000
 National Record for development of air turbine engine for running motor bike – LIMCA Book of Records, March 2014
 National Record as the first academicians’ work in US school text book – LIMCA Book of Records  February 2015.
 100 Most Influential Vice Chancellors Award, 2016, Mumbai.
 Asia's Education Excellence Award – Exemplary Leader award, 2016, Singapore
 Letter of Appreciation from Vice Chancellor, U.P. Technical University, Lucknow, 2006
Letter of Appreciation from Vice Chancellor, Mahamaya Technical University, Noida, 2011

Books authored 
Onkar has authored many books widely used as textbooks in many engineering colleges across India.

 Engineering Thermodynamics
 Applied Thermodynamics
 Introduction to Mechanical Engineering (Thermodynamics & Strength of Materials)
 Thermal Turbomachines
 Elements of Mechanical Engineering
 Challenges and Strategies for Sustainable Energy, Efficiency, and Environment
 Thermodynamic Investigation Upon Combined Cycle with Inlet Air Cooling
 Thermodynamic Analysis Of Combined Power Cycle With Ammonia Water Mixture For Power Generation
 Some Discourses on Education - In Indian Context
 Musings on Education
 The Catch 22s of Indian Education

He also has contributions in many popular books on climate change and global warming, like

 The Impact of Air Pollution on Health, Agriculture and Technology
 Fossil Fuel and the Environment
 Global Warming – Impacts and Future Perspective
 Can Glacier and Ice Melt Be Reversed?

He has also authored large number of articles and his books on education titled "Some Discourses on Education– in Indian Context","Musings on Education", & , "The Catch 22s of Indian Education"  discuss the present-day issues with the education in India.

References

External links 
Onkar Singh at Google Scholar
 Onkar Singh on Times of India.Indiatimes.com
 Onkar Singh on News portal
Onkar Singh on Imphal Free Press
  Onkar Singh on eduvoice
Onkar Singh on TheRise.co.in
Onkar Singh on The Pioneer
  Videos of Onkar Singh

Living people
University of Allahabad alumni
Motilal Nehru National Institute of Technology Allahabad alumni
Chhatrapati Shahu Ji Maharaj University alumni
Harcourt Butler Technical University alumni
1968 births